The Macalister River, a perennial river of the West Gippsland catchment, is located in the Alpine and Gippsland regions of the Australian state of Victoria.

Location and features
The Macalister River rises below Mount Howitt, part of the Great Dividing Range in the southern portion of the Alpine National Park; and flows generally south by east in a highly meandering course. The river descends  over its  course. The fertile flats and valley floor of the Macalister River support agriculture around the town of Licola.

Etymology
In the Aboriginal Brataualung language the river was named Wirnwirndook'yeerun, meaning the "song of some bird", purportedly an emu wren.

The river was later named the Macalister River by explorer Angus McMillan, after his then employer, Captain Lachlan Macalister.

See also

 Rivers of Victoria

References

External links
 
 

West Gippsland catchment
Rivers of Gippsland (region)